Natalie Robinson, an Antarctic researcher, is based at the National Institute of Water and Atmospheric Research in New Zealand. She led the final two K131 Science Events on the sea ice of McMurdo Sound, Antarctica.

Education 
Robinson grew up in the Hawke's Bay Region and moved to Victoria University of Wellington to complete her MSc (2005) on tides beneath the McMurdo Ice Shelf with data collected during the ANDRILL project with Alex Pyne and Peter Barrett.  She then completed her PhD (2012) at the University of Otago under the supervision of Pat Langhorne. She now works as a research scientist at National Institute of Water and Atmospheric Research.

Career and impact 
Robinson's work has significant contribution to understanding the oceanic connection between ice shelf and sea ice regimes. This has required direct sub-ice observations of pressure-induced supercooling; multi-phase fluid flow; roughness and drag at the interface; and buoyancy-driven convection. She focuses on the creation, evolution and fate of supercooled water, and its potential to influence sea ice growth

Robinson has led a number of field expeditions to the sea ice of McMurdo Sound, Antarctica.  In 2015, she was awarded a prestigious Marsden grant, amounting to $300,000, to study ice roughness beneath ice shelf affected sea ice. This resulted in two expeditions to McMurdo Sound.  Her studies showed that new ice crystals could refreeze on the underside of sea ice and make the underside much rougher than under smooth melting ice.

This work used Antarctic infrastructure developed by Timothy Haskell. Robinson led the final expeditions using the "K131" Camp Haskell. The "K131" is an event designation assigned by Antarctica New Zealand.

She has worked with the artist Gabby O'Connor when O'Connor participated in Robinson's 2017 field expedition. This resulted in an exhibition at the Otago Museum in 2018. The lead-character in the play "Chilled: A Cool Story with a Warm Message" was based on Robinson.

In 2021 was named by Forbes Magazine to a panel of seven outstanding researchers in STEM. She has served as Treasurer on the Council of the New Zealand Association of Scientists.

References

External links 
  Natalie Robinson's webpage
 Natalie Robinson on Google scholar

New Zealand Antarctic scientists
Women Antarctic scientists
Living people
New Zealand scientists
Year of birth missing (living people)
Victoria University of Wellington alumni
University of Otago alumni
Recipients of Marsden grants